Let's Go is a 1918 American short comedy film featuring Harold Lloyd.

Cast
 Harold Lloyd 
 Snub Pollard 
 Bebe Daniels 
 William Blaisdell
 Sammy Brooks
 Lige Conley - (as Lige Cromley)
 Billy Fay
 Gus Leonard
 James Parrott
 Dorothea Wolbert

See also
 Harold Lloyd filmography

External links

1918 films
1918 short films
American silent short films
1918 comedy films
American black-and-white films
Films directed by Alfred J. Goulding
Silent American comedy films
American comedy short films
1910s American films